Cotaena magnifica is a species of sedge moth in the genus Cotaena. It was described by Jae-Cheon Sohn and John B. Heppner in 2015. It is found in the Amazon basin of Brazil.

References

Moths described in 2015
Glyphipterigidae